Robert Trask Mann (June 5, 1924 – February 26, 2002) was an American judge and politician. He served as a Democratic member for the 60th district of the Florida House of Representatives.

Life and career 
Mann was born in Tarpon Springs, Florida. He attended Tarpon Springs High School, the University of Florida, George Washington University, Harvard University, Yale University and Stetson University.

In 1957, Mann was elected to the Florida House of Representatives. In 1967, he was elected as the first representative of the newly-established 60th district. Mann resigned in 1968 and was succeeded by R. Ed Blackburn Jr. In the same year, he was elected to serve as a judge for the Florida Second District Court of Appeal, serving until 1974.

Mann died in February 2002, at the age of 77.

References 

1924 births
2002 deaths
People from Tarpon Springs, Florida
Democratic Party members of the Florida House of Representatives
20th-century American politicians
Florida state court judges
20th-century American judges
Judges of the Florida District Courts of Appeal
University of Florida alumni
George Washington University alumni
Harvard University alumni
Yale University alumni
Stetson University alumni